Jessica Maria Ziu (born 6 June 2002) is an Irish footballer who plays as a midfielder for West Ham United and has appeared for the Republic of Ireland women's national team.

Club career
Ziu was born on 6 June 2002 and is from Dublin, Ireland. Her father moved to Ireland from Albania in 1998. She began playing soccer at five years old, and joined Rivermount Boys in Finglas where she was the only girl in the team.

After starting the 2018 season with Shelbourne's youth team for the new Under 17 Women's National League, Ziu was quickly promoted to the club's senior panel. She made her Women's National League debut shortly after turning 16 years old in June 2018.

She enjoyed good form in the 2020 Women's National League, being named WNL Player of the Month for October 2020 and named in the Team of the Season. In 2021 she helped Shelbourne win the WNL title and played in the 3–1 2021 FAI Women's Cup Final defeat by Wexford Youths. In March 2022 Ziu agreed a summer transfer to English FA Women's Super League club West Ham United.

In October 2022 Ziu suffered an anterior cruciate ligament injury in a 2022–23 FA Women's League Cup fixture against London City Lionesses.

International career

Youth

Ziu represented Ireland at schoolgirl level while she attended Larkin Community College, Dublin City. At the FAI International Football Awards she was named 2018 Under-16 Women's International Player of the Year.

Senior

Ireland's senior national team coach Colin Bell called up Ziu for the first time in August 2018, for a home FIFA Women's World Cup qualifying fixture against Northern Ireland. "She's still very young. She's just turned 16, but needs to be in this environment," he said. She won her first cap in Ireland's 4–0 win, entering play as a 75th-minute substitute for Rianna Jarrett.

On 9 October 2018, she played in Ireland's 4–0 friendly defeat by Poland in Ostróda, coming on for Jarrett on 53 minutes. She won a third senior cap in a 1–0 friendly defeat by Belgium, at San Pedro del Pinatar, Spain in January 2019.

References

External links
 
 
 

2002 births
Living people
Republic of Ireland women's association footballers
Republic of Ireland women's international footballers
Women's association football forwards
Shelbourne F.C. (women) players
Irish people of Albanian descent
Rivermount Boys F.C. players
Association footballers from Dublin (city)
Republic of Ireland women's youth international footballers
Republic of Ireland expatriate association footballers
West Ham United F.C. Women players
Women's Super League players
Expatriate women's footballers in England
Irish expatriate sportspeople in England
Women's National League (Ireland) players